|}

The Cheltenham Chase, currently known for sponsorship purposes as the Shloer Chase, is a Grade 2 National Hunt chase in Great Britain which is open to horses aged five years or older. It is run on the Old Course at Cheltenham over a distance of about 2 miles (1 mile 7 furlongs and 199 yards, or 3,199 metres), and during its running there are twelve fences to be jumped. The race is scheduled to take place each year on the Sunday of the course's November meeting. 

The race's registered title is the Cheltenham Chase but it has been run under a series of sponsored titles. Inaugurated in 2009 as the Connaught Chase, it was run as the Sinbad Testimonial 2010/2011 Chase before adopting its current name following sponsorship from drinks company Shloer. Initially a conditions chase, it was upgraded to a listed race in 2013 before attaining Grade 2 status in 2015.

Winners

See also
 Horse racing in Great Britain
 List of British National Hunt races

References

 Racing Post:
 , 

National Hunt races in Great Britain
Cheltenham Racecourse
National Hunt chases